On the Sunny Side of the Strip is a 1960 live album by the George Shearing quintet, one of five live albums recorded by the quintet.

Track listing
"Jordu" (Duke Jordan) – 4:10
"As I Love You" (Ray Evans, Jay Livingston) – 3:15
"Confirmation" (Charlie Parker) – 4:25
"The Nearness of You" (Hoagy Carmichael, Ned Washington) – 3:40
"Mambo Inn" (Mario Bauzá, Edgar Sampson, Bobby Woodlen) – 3:09
"Bernie's Tune" (Leiber and Stoller, Bernard Miller) – 3:25
"Some Other Spring" (Arthur Herzog Jr., Irene Kitchings) – 3:45
"Joy Spring" (Clifford Brown) – 4:25
"Drume Negrita" (Eliseo Grenet, Ernesto Wood Grenet) – 6:43

Personnel
George Shearing - piano
Emil Richards - vibraphone
Toots Thielemans - guitar
Al McKibbon - double bass
Percy Brice - drums
Armando Peraza - congas

References

1960 live albums
George Shearing live albums
Albums produced by Dave Cavanaugh
Capitol Records live albums